Hisham Kelati is a Canadian stand-up comedian. He is most noted for his 2021 comedy album Tigre King, for which he was a Juno Award nominee for Comedy Album of the Year at the Juno Awards of 2022.

He was previously a Canadian Comedy Award nominee for Best Taped Live Performance at the 19th Canadian Comedy Awards in 2019, for his appearance on the web comedy series 10 Minute Talk Show.

References

External links

21st-century Canadian comedians
Canadian stand-up comedians
Canadian male comedians
Black Canadian comedians
Canadian Muslims
Comedians from Toronto
Canadian people of Eritrean descent
Living people
Year of birth missing (living people)